Gerard Cieślik (27 April 1927 – 3 November 2013), also known as Gienek, was a football player of Ruch Chorzów (1949-1955 Unia Chorzów, 1956 Unia-Ruch Chorzów). Playing for the Poland national football team, he is most noted for having scored two goals against the Soviet Union on 20 October 1957 at Stadion Śląski. The rather small striker (163 cm, 59 kg) was capped 45 times and scored 27 goals. He also played for Poland at the 1952 Summer Olympics.

Biography
Born in Wielkie Hajduki, now a part of Chorzów, he spent his entire career with Ruch, from July 1939 to June 1959, a tenure which included victory in the 1951 Polish Cup, and 3 Poland Master titles (1951, 1952, 1953). In total, he scored 177 goals for Ruch. He became the club's coach and scout in 1959, and having never cut ties with the team, is seen as a great example of loyalty within the Polish game.

He was drafted to Wehrmacht 1944/1945 and transferred to Denmark.

In 2003, after a particular group of Ruch fans controversially displayed a banner with the German name for Upper Silesia, Cieslik expressed his opposition to the banner and urged the fans to respect the memory of the club's founders who had been patriots and participated in the Silesian Uprisings against German rule of Silesia.

In 2006, the documentary film Das Alphabet von Gerard Cieślik was presented by Antena Górnośląska as part of the exhibition Oberschlesier in der deutschen und polnischen Fußballnationalmannschaft – gestern und heute. Sport und Politik in Oberschlesien im 20. Jahrhundert covering Upper Silesians who played for the Poland national football team and/or the Germany national football team.

In 2006, he signed a protest against Roman Giertych.

See also
Sport in Poland
List of Polish football players

References

External links

Football Exhibition of Haus der Deutsch-Polnischen Zusammenarbeit
Details at sport.pl 
Details at IMDb.de 
Profile at goalgate.de (with photo) 

1927 births
2013 deaths
Sportspeople from Chorzów
Poland international footballers
Polish footballers
Ruch Chorzów players
Ekstraklasa players
Olympic footballers of Poland
Footballers at the 1952 Summer Olympics
Polish football managers
Ruch Chorzów managers
Association football forwards